Belle de nuit is a French phrase meaning "Beauty of the night".

Belle de nuit may refer to:
 Belle de Nuit (horse), a horse winner of the Test Stakes race in 1966
 Belle de nuit (film), a 1933 French film with Véra Korène
 Belle de Nuit, a 2017 French biopic film about Grisélidis Réal
 Les Belles de nuit (US title: Beauties of the Night), a 1952 French language motion picture fantasy directed and written by René Clair

Plants 
 Mirabilis jalapa or four o'clock flower, an ornamental plant
 Epiphyllum oxypetalum or queen of the night, a species of cactus
 Oenothera macrocarpa or bigfruit evening primrose, a flowering plant

See also 
 Les Belles-de-nuit ou les Anges de la famille, an adventure novel by Paul Féval